Phillip Maddock (born 9 October 1961) is a former Australian rules footballer who played with Geelong in the Victorian Football League (VFL).

Maddock, who came from Winchelsea, played in three reserves premierships with Geelong (1980, 1981, 1982). His three senior appearances for Geelong all came in the 1982 VFL season, rounds three to five, before he dropped out of the team with knee re-constructions.

He was captain of St Peters in 1985.

References

1961 births
Australian rules footballers from Victoria (Australia)
Geelong Football Club players
Living people